Homadaula albida is a moth in the family Galacticidae. It was described by Wolfram Mey in 2004. It is found in Namibia.

References

Moths described in 2004
Galacticidae